Amélie Mauresmo won in the final 6–2, 6–0 against Magdalena Maleeva.

Seeds
A champion seed is indicated in bold text while text in italics indicates the round in which that seed was eliminated. The top four seeds received a bye to the second round.

  Venus Williams (semifinals)
  Conchita Martínez (second round)
  Nathalie Tauziat (second round)
  Elena Dementieva (quarterfinals)
  Anke Huber (semifinals)
  Amy Frazier (first round)
  Amélie Mauresmo (champion)
  Justine Henin (second round)

Draw

Final

Top half

Bottom half

References
 2001 Internationaux de Tennis Feminin Nice Draw

Internationaux de Tennis Feminin Nice
2001 WTA Tour